Count Giulio Cesare Gotti Porcinari (Florence, 17 August 1888 – Rome, 7 September 1946) was an Italian general during World War II.

Biography

Hailing from an old aristocratic family, he held both the titles of Count and Patrician of Volterra, which he had inherited in 1939 at the death of his childless older brother Mario Morando Gotti Porcinari. He was also a Knight of the Military Order of Malta and a personal friend of Crown Prince Umberto. In 1914 he married Margherita Pasca dei Baroni di Magliano, with whom he had four children (Elisabetta, born in 1914; Maria Rosaria and Adele, twins, born in 1921; Alberto, born in 1926). He fought as a second lieutenant in the Bersaglieri during the Italo-Turkish War, earning a Bronze Medal of Military Valor for his behaviour during the fighting in Libya in October–November 1911, and later as a captain, major and lieutenant colonel in the First World War, earning another bronze medal on the Isonzo front in September 1915 and a War Cross for Military Valor in the Valsugana in May 1916.

In 1918-1919 he also fought with the Czechoslovak Legion, both in Italy and Slovakia; for this, he was also decorated by the Czechoslovak government. From 1934 to 1937, with the rank of colonel, he commanded the 1st Bersaglieri Regiment. In August 1939 he was promoted to brigadier general, being then attached to the Army Corps of Rome until November 1939, when he became deputy commander of the 16th Infantry Division Pistoia.

On 15 June 1940, five days after Italy's entry into World War II, he was given command of the Central Military School. In February 1942 he was appointed commander of the 54th Infantry Division Napoli, stationed in southern Sicily (with headquarters in Caltanissetta and later in Vizzini), being promoted to major general five months later. The Napoli Division, stationed between Caltagirone, Mirabella and Piazza Armerina, was tasked with intervening in support of the coastal units in the case of an enemy landing on the coast between Catania, Augusta and Syracuse, and secondarily in support of the garrisons of Gela, Ispica and Pachino. In a report later written about the state of his troops in the summer of 1943, Gotti Porcinari stated:
 

After the Allied landings in Sicily on 10 July 1943, the Division engaged the advancing Allied troops in Noto, Lentini, Brucoli, Floridia, Solarino and Palazzolo Acreide, suffering heavy losses; Gotti Porcinari also ordered a counterattack with the few Renault R35 tanks at his disposal, but this was soon stopped by minefields and the vastly superior Sherman tanks. On 13 July 1943, Gotti Porcinari was surrounded and captured by British troops of the Durham Light Infantry along with his entire staff, near the hamlet of Case Rosse, not far from Solarino. After his capture he was brought before General Bernard Law Montgomery, who demanded that he provide information about the deployment of Italian troops, which he refused, resulting in an altercation between the two. A Time war correspondent wrote that British soldiers joked about having "taken Julius Caesar". He was then taken to Egypt and held there as a prisoner of war for three years, being only released from captivity in April 1946. He died a few months after his repatriation, at age 58.

References

1888 births
1946 deaths
Italian generals
Italian military personnel of World War I
Italian military personnel of World War II
Recipients of the Bronze Medal of Military Valor

sl:Giulio Cesare Gotti Porcinari